The Murder Game is a 1965 British crime film starring Ken Scott, Marla Landi, Trader Faulkner, Conrad Phillips and directed by Sidney Salkow.  The film was distributed by Twentieth Century-Fox.

It was the last film directed by Sidney Salkow.

Plot
While on his honeymoon, a husband discovers the plan of his bigamous wife with her first husband to murder him for his money and he plans counter measures to throw the blame on them.

Cast
 Ken Scott as Steve Baldwin
 Marla Landi as Marie Aldrich
 Trader Faulkner as Chris Aldrich
 Conrad Phillips as Peter Shanley
 Gerald Sim as Larry Landstrom
 Duncan Lamont as Inspector Telford
 Peter Bathurst as Dr. Knight
 Ballard Berkeley as Sir Colin Chalmers
 Victor Brooks as Rev Francis Hood
 Dyan Cannon		
 John Dunbar as Parkhill
 Gretchen Franklin as Landlady
 Clement Freud as Croupier
 Jimmy Gardner as Arthur Gillett
 Rosamund Greenwood as Mrs. Potter 
 Derek Partridge as Police Sergeant
 John Richmond as Prosecutor
 Frank Thornton as Radio Announcer

References

External links

1965 films
British crime drama films
Films directed by Sidney Salkow
1960s English-language films
1960s British films